Baldy Mountain is the highest peak in Manitoba, Canada. It is located in the Duck Mountain Provincial Park, North of Grand View.

References 

Mountains of Manitoba
Duck Mountain Provincial Park (Manitoba)
Mountains of Canada under 1000 metres